Olish Shilshi or SS. Olish is a politician from Manipur. She was elected from Chandel Assembly constituency in 2022 Manipur Legislative Assembly election and became first from Lamkang tribe and second Naga woman to be elected to Manipur Legislative Assembly.

References 

Living people
1977 births
Manipur MLAs 2022–2027
Bharatiya Janata Party politicians from Manipur
People from Chandel district